The 2017–18 Hazfi Shield Cup was the 31st season of the Iranian football knockout competition. The competition begin in August 2017 and the final was played on May 3, 2018. Mehdi Sharifi, then center forward for Persian side Tractor SC was the Cup's top scorer with five goals.  The Cup was won by Esteghla FC in a 1–0 victory over Khooneh Be Khooneh. The Finals only goal was scored by Mame Thiam, an Esteghlal forward in the 35' minute of the game.  This was Esteghlal seventh Hazfi Cup title.

Participating teams
A total of 62 teams participated in the 2017–18 Hazfi Cup. The teams were divided into three main groups.

16 teams of the Persian Gulf Pro League:

18 teams of Azadegan League:

First stage
In the first stage of "2017–18 Hazfi Cup", 28 teams from  Provincial Leagues were presented. Following the competition of the first stage, 14 teams qualified for the second stage.

First round

Second stage
The 18 teams from Azadegan League are entered to competition from the second stage. They compete together with 14 winner teams of First stage.

Second round

Third round (round of 32)
The 16 teams from Iran Pro League entered the competition from the second stage.

Fourth round (round of 16)

Fifth round (quarter-final)

Sixth round (semifinal)

Seventh round (final)

See also 
 Iran Pro League 2017–18
 Azadegan League 2017–18
 Iran Football's 2nd Division 2017–18
 Iran Football's 3rd Division 2017–18
 Iranian Super Cup

References

Hazfi Cup seasons
Hazfi Cup
Hazfi Cup